The 1946 Marseille Grand Prix (formally the V Grand Prix de Marseille) was a Grand Prix motor race held at Marseille on 13 May 1946. The event included 2 x 15 lap heats followed by a 35 lap final.

Classification

References

Marseille Grand Prix
Marseille Grand Prix